Jolán Kleiber-Kontsek (29 August 1939 – 20 July 2022) was a Hungarian athlete who mainly competed in the discus throw event during her career.

In 1964, she finished sixth in the discus competition at the Olympics. She competed for Hungary in the 1968 Summer Olympics held in Mexico City, Mexico where she won a bronze medal in the discus throw competition.

She was named Hungarian Sportswoman of The Year in 1965 after having won the Summer Universiade the same year held in her hometown, Budapest.

External links 
 
 
 
 

1939 births
2022 deaths
Hungarian female discus throwers
Hungarian female shot putters
Athletes (track and field) at the 1964 Summer Olympics
Athletes (track and field) at the 1968 Summer Olympics
Olympic athletes of Hungary
Olympic bronze medalists for Hungary
Athletes from Budapest
European Athletics Championships medalists
Medalists at the 1968 Summer Olympics
Olympic bronze medalists in athletics (track and field)
Universiade medalists in athletics (track and field)
Universiade gold medalists for Hungary
Medalists at the 1961 Summer Universiade
Medalists at the 1963 Summer Universiade
Medalists at the 1965 Summer Universiade
20th-century Hungarian women
21st-century Hungarian women